Chikunia bilde is a species of comb-footed spider in the family Theridiidae. It is found in Malaysia, Singapore, and Indonesia. The Chikunia bilde was first discovered in 2019 by researchers and is described as being unusually tolerant of human activity.

References

Theridiidae
Spiders described in 2019